Anthony Barratt (born 18 October 1965) is an English former footballer. He played for Billingham Town, Grimsby Town, Hartlepool United, York City and Bishop Auckland.

References

External links

1965 births
Living people
Footballers from Salford
English footballers
Association football defenders
Billingham Town F.C. players
Grimsby Town F.C. players
Hartlepool United F.C. players
York City F.C. players
Bishop Auckland F.C. players
English Football League players